Boniface Mukuka (born 6 February 1972) is a Zambian boxer. He competed in the men's flyweight event at the 1996 Summer Olympics.

References

1972 births
Living people
Zambian male boxers
Olympic boxers of Zambia
Boxers at the 1996 Summer Olympics
Place of birth missing (living people)
Flyweight boxers